The 1938 Cotton Bowl Classic was the second edition of the Cotton Bowl Classic, featuring the Colorado Buffaloes and the Rice Owls.

Background
Senior halfback Byron "Whizzer" White was the highlight on a Colorado team that had an unbeaten regular season. A Rhodes Scholar and Heisman Trophy runner-up, the future Supreme Court justice was a consensus All-American who could defend, run, punt, and pass the ball.

Rice were led by sophomores, highlighted by Ernie Lain, dubbed by sportswriter Grantland Rice as "football’s greatest sophomore back." This was the first bowl game for both programs.

Game summary
Colorado sprung up a 14–0 lead after the first quarter on a Joe Antonio touchdown catch and a White interception return for a touchdown. But Lain was determined; he threw two touchdown passes to  Jake Schuehle and Ollie Cordill, and then ran for a touchdown to take a 21–14 lead into halftime.

Frank Steen caught a touchdown pass from Lain in the third quarter to seal the game for the Owls, who dominated the Buffaloes on defense for most of the game, who had less first downs than punts. Colorado's next appearance in the Cotton Bowl was in January 1996, while Rice returned in 1950, and went to two more in a span of eight years (1954, 1958).

Statistics

Outstanding Players
Colorado
Byron White (future NFL player and future Supreme Court Justice of the United States)
Leon Lavington Jr. (future NFL player, Chicago Cardinals, son of Leon Lavington Sr., Colorado State Treasurer)

Rice
Ernie Lain

References

Cotton Bowl Classic
Cotton Bowl Classic
Colorado Buffaloes football bowl games
Rice Owls football bowl games
Cotton Bowl
Cotton Bowl Classic